The Man Who Laughed at Love (Spanish:El hombre que se reía del amor) is a 1933 Spanish comedy film directed by Benito Perojo. It was made at the Orphea Studios in Barcelona.

Cast
  María Fernanda Ladrón de Guevara 
 Rafael Rivelles as Juan Herrero  
 Rosita Díaz Gimeno 
 Antoñita Colomé
 Ricardo Muñoz
 Gabriel Algara

References

Bibliography 
  Eva Woods Peiró. White Gypsies: Race and Stardom in Spanish Musical Films. U of Minnesota Press, 2012.

External links 
 

1933 comedy films
Spanish comedy films
1933 films
1930s Spanish-language films
Films directed by Benito Perojo
Spanish black-and-white films